Hato Hone St John Youth is a cadet-based programme for children and young people aged between five and eighteen. Members who turn eighteen tend to remain involved in leadership roles.
St John Youth is closely affiliated with the Order of St John in New Zealand, of which His Majesty King Charles III is the Sovereign Head.
St John Youth is divided into two programmes. There is the Penguin Programme for children aged 5–8, and the Cadet Programme for young people aged 8–18.
The Youth curriculum focuses on leadership, life skills, and fun, with first aid, drill, and other uniquely-Aotearoa New Zealand aspects central to the programme.

Regions 
Hato Hone St John Youth is divided into three regions around New Zealand; each has a Regional Youth Manager, Regional Cadet of the Year (RCOTY) and Deputy RCOTY (DRCOTY). The organisation is also led by the National Youth Manager and National Cadet of the Year. 

For 2023, they are:

Cadets of the Year (District [x~22] Regional [x3] and National [x1]) represent the interests of young people at all levels of the programme, from District Youth Leadership Teams to Priory Chapter, the highest governing body for Hato Hone St John in Aotearoa New Zealand. For the duration of their term (one year), on their uniforms, DCOTYs wear blue fourragères; DRCOTYs wear silver fourragères; RCOTYs wear silver aiguillettes; the NCOTY wears gold aiguillettes.

Grand Prior Award Scheme 
The Grand Prior Award Scheme is often considered to be the highest achievement available for St John Youth members.
Badges are split into three levels - Green, Blue and Gold. In order to earn the Grand Prior, a cadet must achieve the 6 compulsory badges plus 6 other optional badges, all at Gold level, in addition to 100 hours of community service.

The badges available are: (note badges with an * beside them indicates a compulsory badge)

Ranks

Competitions 
Competitions are held regularly throughout the year, with tests on Basic Life Support, Caregivers, Communication, Drill and First Aid
Divisions can enter teams of up to two competitors for Penguin (5- to 8-year-olds) and Junior (9- to 12-year-olds) competitions, and there are four team members in Intermediate (13- and 14-year-olds) and four team members in Senior (15- to 18-year-olds) teams.
All three regions hold District Competitions where the top teams and individuals then progress through to the Regional Competitions.

Both Northern and Central regions compete annually at Interprovincial Competitions. To qualify to go to Interprovincial's your team needs to gain a 1st, 2nd or 3rd placing in the Quiz Roadshow (Central Region) or get a placing in the Hutchinson Cup (Northern Region) quiz competition. Additionally, both regions send 5 teams to Interprovincial's the first 4 from either the Quiz test or Hutchinson Cup and the other team is selected at regional discretion by the Regional Youth Manager or their nominee.

National Youth Festival 
The National Youth Festival is held every year in a different region. This is a competition where all regions from around New Zealand meet for competitions which are often held in June.

In 2021, the National Youth Festival was held in Wellington during April. All regions run a process to select their squads that will represent their Region at competitions. Each Region has a different process and must select a regional squad that consists of four teams of four, four individuals and four ‘emergencies’, although some Regions select development squads that don't compete on the day but train with the squad, or as a non-competing emergency.

The National Youth Festival is often considered the highest level of competing within the St John Youth programme.

The Champion Region title has been held by the South Island Region since 2013. 

The competition was cancelled in 2020 and 2022 due to the COVID-19 pandemic.

International Youth Festival 
In 2010 New Zealand hosted an International Youth Festival. Held between 25 and 31 January at Lincoln University near Christchurch. Cadets from 8 other countries, such as England, Wales, Germany, Canada, Malaysia, Singapore, Hong Kong and Australia attended the festival, which incorporated both the National and International competitions. The Northern Region South Island team won the National Competitions, winning Champion Team, Champion Individual and Champion Region, amongst other trophies. Other activities during the festival included an 'Amazing Puzzle Race' around Christchurch city center, a visit to Hamner Springs and Thrillseekers canyon, a Youth Symposium, in which cadets listened to speakers and discussed issues faced Youth in today's world, a sports championship, surfing and Sightseeing around Christchurch City and the International Antarctic Center.

Every 4 years an international Youth Festival is held. The last international youth festival was held in Sydney in January 2014. South Africa is set to host the next International Youth Festival in January 2020.

Divisions 
Each region in St John Youth is made up of "Divisions" in which cadets meet. Divisions usually meet for an hour and a half and once a week. Each Division has a Divisional Manager and many have Assistant Divisional Managers as well.

In New Zealand, the first cadet division was started on 2 May 1927 by Mr Ted Gilberd in Whanganui.

Child Protection Policy 
St John Youth has a nationwide Child Protection Policy (CPP) which ensures the safety of its cadets. The policy includes a rule which means that no cadet can be with a leader (any St John member over the age of 18) on their own. The CPP also details the Youth to Adult ratio, which aims to ensure that there are enough Adults to care for the Youth members.

Joining St John Youth 
Those who wish to join St John Youth can contact a Division in their area and then attend a Divisional Meeting. It costs NZ$40.00 per year, plus additional fees for attending events, such as competitions or camps. The sew-on proficiency badges, certificates and badge material are included in the annual fee. For those facing financial hardship, St John has funds available to meet costs in cases of financial hardship.

References

External links 
 St John Youth NZ (official website)
 St John New Zealand (official website)

New Zealand Cadet Forces